Joseph Ward Simmons (born November 14, 1964), better known by the stage name Run,  Rev. Run or DJ Run, is an American rapper, producer, DJ and television personality. Simmons is one of the founding members of the influential hip hop group Run-DMC. He is also a practicing minister, known as Reverend Run.

He found new popularity in 2005 with his family's MTV reality show Run's House.

Early life
Simmons was born November 14, 1964, in Hollis, Queens, New York. He is the younger brother of artist Danny Simmons and Russell Simmons, the co-founder of Def Jam records.

Career
Before Run–D.M.C., Simmons was the lead vocalist in the hip-hop group named "The Force." He founded Run-D.M.C. as a lead vocalist along with friend Darryl "D.M.C." McDaniels and the late DJ Jason "Jam-Master Jay" Mizell.

Run began using the stage name of "Rev. Run" after he was ordained as a Pentecostal minister by E. Bernard Jordan, Simmons's spiritual mentor. Jordan also named him "Protege of the Year Award" in 2004.  The same day, symbolic of his "Prosperity Ministry", there was a "Rolls-Royce parade outside the Plaza Hotel in New York City, "featuring Jordan's Phantom Rolls-Royce.  The new $325,000 Phantom had been a gift from Reverend Run as a "thank you" for Jordan's mentoring support.

His first work as Rev. Run was a feature in the single "Song 4 Lovers" by UK pop band Liberty X in September 2005. The music video for that song was directed by Bill Schacht for Aestheticom and reached broadcast airplay chart positions of No. 2 Box UK and No. 4 MTV UK with heavy rotation on 5 other music channels in the UK. "Song 4 Lovers" also reached No. 5 on the Official Charts Company's UK Top 40 Singles Chart, becoming the band's seventh top ten hit.

It was followed by his first solo album, Distortion. The first single from the album, "Mind on the Road", is featured in the EA Sports's Madden NFL 06 video game. "Mind on the Road" uses samples from the song "I Love Rock 'n' Roll", in the tradition of Run–D.M.C.'s 1980s hits which use samples like Aerosmith's hit "Walk This Way".

In 2002, he appeared on a special "Rap Stars" edition of The Weakest Link, and was the third one voted off.

Rev Run appeared on the MTV series Run's House, a reality show revolving around his everyday life with his family, from 2005-2009.

In 2007, he appeared with his son Diggy Simmons on My Super Sweet 16 while attending a 16th birthday party for Diddy's son, Quincy. Diddy is also the producer of Run's House.

In 2008, Simmons and his wife Justine teamed up with Kool-Aid and a non-profit organization called KaBOOM! to help build playgrounds in underserved communities. With Kool-Aid, they are helping to build twenty four playgrounds over the course of 2008 and hope to raise awareness for the need for safe play spaces.

On August 5, 2008, Gotham Press published Simmons' book, Take Back Your Family: A Challenge to America's Parents, co-authored by his wife, Justine Simmons, and Chris Morrow.

On September 8, 2007, Rev Run was honored as a BMI Icon at the annual BMI Urban Awards.

The weekend of September 17 and 18 of 2011, Rev Run made a special guest appearance at Bay Area Fellowship with Pastor Bil Cornelius in Corpus Christi, Texas Bay Area Fellowship Church.

In October 2011, Rev Run was a special guest of Fellowship Church based out of Grapevine, Texas.

Simmons has also created three other cable series, two premiered in 2014; Rev Run's Renovation which runs on both the DIY Network and HGTV, and Rev Run's Sunday Suppers for Cooking Channel, the other Rev Runs Around the World premiered on the Travel Channel in 2016.

Personal life
Simmons married Valerie Vaughn in 1983. They have three children: Vanessa Simmons, Angela Simmons, and Joseph "JoJo" Ward Simmons, Jr.

He married Justine Jones on June 25, 1994. With her, he had three more children: Daniel "Diggy" Simmons III, Russell "Russy" Simmons II, and Victoria Anne Simmons.  Victoria was four pounds, five ounces when she was delivered via caesarean section. She died shortly after being born on September 26, 2006, due to omphalocele, a birth defect that caused her organs to grow outside her body. The Simmons' allowed MTV camera crews of Run's House to document baby Victoria's death, telling 'People' that "God, in my mind, gave us something to go through in front of America, so we documented it on-camera – not so much to show you sadness, but to show you how we, as ministers, would handle this tragedy. [The kids] found out on-camera. Diggy was waiting to see, 'How's Mommy?' And the first words we said were, 'The baby didn't make it.'" Soon  they adopted a baby girl, Miley Justine Simmons .

The Simmons family lives in Saddle River, New Jersey in a six-bedroom colonial-style home that was listed for sale in 2007 for $5.5 million.

In 2017, Simmons said he was adopting vegetarianism because God advised him to.

Discography

Solo

With Run-D.M.C.

References

External links

 
 
 
 Official Run's House Website
 Story of the Death of Run's Daughter

1964 births
Living people
African-American Christian clergy
American Christian clergy
African-American male rappers
African-American record producers
American hip hop record producers
American motivational writers
American Pentecostal pastors
American spiritual writers
American hip hop DJs
Participants in American reality television series
People from Hollis, Queens
People from Saddle River, New Jersey
Rappers from New York City
Run-DMC members
20th-century American rappers
21st-century American rappers
Record producers from New York (state)
Christians from New York (state)